"All Mixed Up" is a single released by 311. It was on the album 311, also known as The Blue Album. This album was released in 1995 and later went triple platinum, selling over 3 million copies worldwide. The song was co-written by Douglas Vincent "SA" Martinez and Nick Hexum. The duo first started working on the song during the 311 tour supporting Grassroots. After the tour Martinez wrote the lyrics about feeling "confused and being unfaithful" and Hexum took the song's title from an early Elvis Presley interview in which Elvis claimed he was "all mixed up" over his new-found fame. It later became one of the band’s signature singles.

The band often performs a rearranged version of the song that appears on setlists as "All Re-Mixed Up."

The song uses elements of the Stalag riddim and also begins with a sample from reggae artist Yellowman's song Mister Chin on the album Mister Yellowman.

Music video
The music video is filmed in New York City and it features the band visiting a massage parlor, riding in a taxi cab, and performing the song for a small audience in an apartment.

Track listing

Charts

Cover versions
Blake Lewis, the runner-up on the sixth season of American Idol, sang a cover of "All Mixed Up" on March 6, 2007, telling host Ryan Seacrest afterwards that 311 was his all-time favorite band. Idol judges Randy Jackson and Paula Abdul were not familiar with the song. Hexum said his phone was "ringing off the hook" after Lewis' performance.

References

External links

1996 singles
311 (band) songs
Songs written by Nick Hexum
Songs written by SA Martinez
1995 songs